Dover Beaches North is an unincorporated community and census-designated place (CDP) located within Toms River, in Ocean County, New Jersey, United States. As of the 2010 United States Census, the CDP's population was 1,239.  The CDP includes the communities of Ocean Beaches 1, 2 and 3, Chadwick Beach, Chadwick Island, Seacrest Beach, Monterey Beach, Silver Beach, Normandy Shores and half of Normandy Beach. Dover Beaches North is situated on the Barnegat Peninsula, a long, narrow barrier peninsula that separates Barnegat Bay from the Atlantic Ocean.

Toms River Township is split by the United States Census Bureau into three CDPs; Toms River CDP on the mainland including over 95% of the township's population, along with Dover Beaches North and Dover Beaches South.

Geography
According to the United States Census Bureau, the CDP had a total area of 1.587 square miles (4.111 km2), including 0.922 square miles (2.387 km2) of land and 0.665 square miles (1.723 km2) of water (41.92%).

Demographics

2010 census

2000 census
As of the 2000 United States Census there were 1,785 people, 974 households, and 529 families residing in the CDP. The population density was 703.3/km2 (1,821.8/mi2). There were 4,119 housing units at an average density of 1,622.8/km2 (4,203.9/mi2). The racial makeup of the CDP was 100% White.

There were 974 households, out of which 9.5% had children under the age of 18 living with them, 46.7% were married couples living together, 5.5% had a female householder with no husband present, and 45.6% were non-families. 42.2% of all households were made up of individuals, and 24.0% had someone living alone who was 65 years of age or older. The average household size was 1.83 and the average family size was 2.44.

In the CDP the population was spread out, with 9.0% under the age of 18, 3.6% from 18 to 24, 18.2% from 25 to 44, 30.7% from 45 to 64, and 38.5% who were 65 years of age or older. The median age was 58 years. For every 100 females, there were 90.1 males. For every 100 females age 18 and over, there were 91.0 males.

The median income for a household in the CDP was $430,125, and the median income for a family was $580,125. Males had a median income of $570,917 versus $320,083 for females. The per capita income for the CDP was $320,613. About 2.6% of families and 5.4% of the population were below the poverty line, including none of those under age 18 and 4.3% of those age 65 or over.

History
What is now Dover Beaches North was first settled in the early 19th century by the Chadwick family as a hunting and fishing resort. Further development continued in 1883 with the construction of a Coast Guard Lifesaving Station and the completion of the Pennsylvania Railroad on the peninsula, which included a stop at Chadwick Beach. The area was opened to major development after the completion of what is now Route 35 in 1913. The area saw its largest growth as a vacation resort in the middle of the 20th century. In 1961, the Pennsylvania Railroad right-of-way was converted into a new southbound roadway for Route 35, allowing the original 1913 roadway to exclusively carry northbound traffic. Today, the area consists of several private beaches governed by homeowners' associations; there are no public beaches in the CDP. These private beach communities, from south to north, are roughly as follows:

Ocean Beach, developed from 1946 into the 1960s and consisting of four sections (Units 1-3 and Ocean Beach Shores)
Brightwater Beach
Rutherford Beach
Sunset Manor
Monterey Beach, established in 1948
Seacrest Beach, established in 1954
Chadwick Beach
Silver Beach
Normandy Beach, established in 1916

Climate

According to the Köppen climate classification system, Dover Beaches North, New Jersey has a humid subtropical climate (Cfa). Cfa climates are characterized by all months having an average mean temperature > 32.0 °F (> 0.0 °C), at least four months with an average mean temperature ≥ 50.0 °F (≥ 10.0 °C), at least one month with an average mean temperature ≥ 71.6 °F (≥ 22.0 °C) and no significant precipitation difference between seasons. During the summer months at Dover Beaches North, a cooling afternoon sea breeze is present on most days, but episodes of extreme heat and humidity can occur with heat index values ≥ 95 °F (≥ 35 °C). On average, the wettest month of the year is July which corresponds with the annual peak in thunderstorm activity. During the winter months, episodes of extreme cold and wind can occur with wind chill values < 0 °F (< -18 °C). The plant hardiness zone at Dover Beaches North is 7a with an average annual extreme minimum air temperature of 3.4 °F (-15.9 °C). The average seasonal (Nov-Apr) snowfall total is between 18 and 24 inches (46 and 61 cm), and the average snowiest month is February which corresponds with the annual peak in nor'easter activity.

Ecology

According to the A. W. Kuchler U.S. potential natural vegetation types, Dover Beaches North, New Jersey would have a dominant vegetation type of Northern Cordgrass (73) with a dominant vegetation form of Coastal Prairie (20).

References

External links
 Silver Beach Webpage

Census-designated places in Ocean County, New Jersey
Jersey Shore communities in Ocean County
Toms River, New Jersey